Papparapatti may refer to:

 Papparapatti, Dharmapuri
 Papparapatti, Salem